Cowie  may refer to:

People
Cowie (surname)

Places
Cowie, Aberdeenshire, an historic fishing village located at the north side of Stonehaven, Scotland
Cowie Castle, a ruined castle in Aberdeenshire, Scotland
Chapel of St. Mary and St. Nathalan (called Cowie Chapel), a ruined chapel in Aberdeenshire, Scotland
Cowie Water, a river discharging to the North Sea at Stonehaven, Scotland
Cowie Bridge, a roadway crossing of the Cowie Water in Stonehaven, Scotland
Cowie, Stirling, a small ex-mining village located on the outskirts of the city of Stirling, in Central Scotland
Cowie, the former name of Corio, Victoria, Australia

Other uses
USS Cowie (DD-632), a destroyer
Cowie Group, a British bus and coach operator now called Arriva